The SSE Arena may refer to three venues:

 SSE Arena, Belfast (part of the Odyssey Complex)
 The SSE Arena, Wembley (sponsored name of the Wembley Arena)
 SSE Hydro, Glasgow, Scotland